Timur and His Team, is a 1940 Soviet action film directed by Aleksandr Razumny based on the novel of the same name.

Plot 
The film tells about a company of pioneers who help the families of soldiers of the Soviet army.

Starring 
 Liviy Shchipachyov as Timur (as L. Shchipachyov)
 Pyotr Savin as Georgy
 Lev Potyomkin as Dr. Koloktschikow (as L. Potyomkin)
 Viktor Seleznyov as Witja (as V. Seleznyov)
 Nikolai Annenkov as (as N. Annenkov)
 Marina Kovalyova as Olga (as M. Kovalyova)
 Yekaterina Derevshchikova as Zhenja (as Ye. Derevzhchikova)
 P. Grokhovsky as Kolja
 Nikolay Kutuzov	
 Igor Smirnov as (as I. Smirnov)
 Boris Yasen as Mishka Kvakin (as B. Yasen)

References

External links 
 

1940 films
1940s Russian-language films
Soviet action films
Soviet black-and-white films
1940s action films
Soviet teen films